Raúl Llorente Raposo (born 2 April 1986) is a Spanish professional footballer who plays as a left-back.

Club career
Born in Madrid, Llorente graduated from the Atlético Madrid youth system, playing three seasons with the reserve side in the Segunda División B. In 2008–09 he first appeared in the Segunda División, starting and being relegated with Alavés.

After one more year with the Basques, Llorente returned to the second tier and signed a two-year contract with Xerez. In January 2012, however, he moved back to division three and joined Tenerife, helping the club to achieve promotion at the end of the 2012–13 campaign by contributing 29 games and two goals (play-offs included).

In another January transfer window, in 2014, Llorente moved abroad for the first time, going on to spend several seasons in the Super League Greece with Kalloni and Platanias. On 28 August 2017, the 31-year-old agreed to a one-year contract with Western Sydney Wanderers of the Australian A-League.

Llorente returned to football on 25 December 2020, joining third division club Villarrobledo.

International career
Llorente represented Spain at the 2003 FIFA U-17 World Championship, making five appearances in the competition for the runners-up.

Career statistics

References

External links

1986 births
Living people
Spanish footballers
Footballers from Madrid
Association football defenders
Segunda División players
Segunda División B players
Atlético Madrid B players
Deportivo Alavés players
Xerez CD footballers
CD Tenerife players
CP Villarrobledo players
Super League Greece players
AEL Kalloni F.C. players
Platanias F.C. players
A-League Men players
Western Sydney Wanderers FC players
Spain youth international footballers
Spanish expatriate footballers
Expatriate footballers in Greece
Expatriate soccer players in Australia
Spanish expatriate sportspeople in Greece
Spanish expatriate sportspeople in Australia